The Russian Civil War spread to the east in May 1918, with a series of revolts along the route of the Trans-Siberian Railway, on the part of the Czechoslovak Legion and officers of the Russian Army. Provisional anti-Bolshevik local governments were formed in many parts of Siberia and other eastern regions during that summer. The Red Army mounted a counter-offensive in the autumn, and in 1919 defeated the White commander Aleksandr Kolchak in Siberia. Smaller-scale conflicts in the region went on until 1923.

Chronology of Revolts and Offensives 

In May 1918, soldiers of the Czechoslovak Legion revolted against the Bolsheviks in Chelyabinsk. The revolt was triggered by Trotsky's order to local Bolshevik commanders to disarm the Czechs (in violation of previous agreements) following a confrontation between the Czechs travelling Eastwards and a train full of Austro-Hungarian former POW's travelling Westwards. The dispute arising because the Czechs had been fighting against the Austro-Hungarians within whose Empire the Czech lands were, tensions were exacerbated because several Czech regiments of the Austro-Hungarian army had gone over to the Russians in the early years of World War I and these former Austro-Hungarian regiments formed the core of the Czech Legion. The Legion was trying to evacuate to the Western Front to continue the fight against the Central powers, but after the Treaty of Brest-Litovsk in March, the Bolsheviks no longer supported this move. The revolt quickly spread across Siberia, because the Czechoslovaks used the Trans-Siberian Railway to move their troops east quickly and because they were supported by local uprisings instigated by Russian army officers. When the uprising reached Yekaterinburg, the former Tsar and his family who were being held there by the Bolsheviks were executed to prevent their release by the Whites. By the end of August, Vladivostok was in Czechoslovak hands.

On 24 of January the red 4th army captured Uralsk

Provisional White governments
In the power vacuum left by the departure of the Bolsheviks multiple White Movement governments were established, most importantly KOMUCH at Samara and the Provisional Siberian Government. KOMUCH quickly ordered a general mobilisation, but its troops were small and badly trained. The Czechoslovaks allied with KOMUCH and advanced to the west, taking Kazan, where they captured the tsar's gold reserves which had been moved east for safekeeping.

In Petrograd, Lenin had called upon factory workers to be dispatched to the Eastern Front.

See also 
 Far Eastern Front in the Russian Civil War

Notes

References 
Bullock, David (2008). The Russian Civil War 1918–22. Osprey Publishing. .

Russian Civil War
History of Siberia
White movement
Military history of the Arctic